Sirilo Lovokuro (spelt also as Sirilo Lovokuru; c. 1965 – 26 August 2014) was a Fijian rugby union player. He played as a centre and as fly-half. He was also one of Fiji's first players to turn professional in Japan.

Career
His first international match was against Wales at Suva on 31 May 1986. He was also part of the 1987 Rugby World Cup roster, where he played only the match against New Zealand.
After retiring from his player career, he became headteacher of the Ratu Nemani Memorial School. He also played for Japan along with Fijian representative Paulo Nawalu in the 1991 Hong Kong Sevens.

Death
On 26 August 2014, Lovokuro died from a heart attack while preparing his Ratu Nemani Memorial school rugby team in Momi but he had left a mark on parents and landowners in the area.

References

External links
 Sirilo Lovokuro international statistics

Fiji international rugby union players
Fijian rugby union players
1965 births
2014 deaths
Rugby union centres
Fijian expatriates in Japan
People from Taveuni
I-Taukei Fijian people
Rugby union fly-halves